Peters was  a British bakery chain. Peters became defunct in 2012 and all bakeries were sold to family-run business Cooplands.

History
It was founded by Peter Knowles in 1966 with its first branch at Belmont in Durham; it had 71 branches across North East England.

Its principal competitors are the Newcastle-based Greggs, who maintain branches in the same area.

In 2003 its production plant at Durham was destroyed in a large fire forcing production to move to temporary accommodation in Peterlee until September 2005 when a new £9 million facility was opened on the same site.

In 2012 22 Peters Bakery stores across the North East region were sold to the family business Coopland and Son of Scarborough; this resulted in the closure of 34 stores.

The Peters’ factory at the Dragonville Industrial Estate, in Durham, also transfer ownership to Cooplands the Peters' retail van business was being transferred over to Cooplands as well.

When Peters' made the sale their financial statements showed it had a turnover of more than £12 million on the back of a network of 58 Peters’ Bakers stores across the North East region.

References

Retail companies established in 1966
Food and drink companies established in 1966
Bakeries of the United Kingdom
Companies based in County Durham